Calderdale is a metropolitan borough of West Yorkshire, England, whose population in 2020 was 211,439. It takes its name from the River Calder, and dale, a word for valley. The name Calderdale usually refers to the borough through which the upper river flows, while the actual landform is known as the Calder Valley. Several small valleys contain tributaries of the River Calder.

Calderdale covers part of the South Pennines, and the Calder Valley is the southernmost of the Yorkshire Dales, though it is not part of the Yorkshire Dales National Park. The borough was formed in 1974 by the merger of six local government districts, from east to west Brighouse, Elland, Halifax, Sowerby Bridge, Hebden Bridge and Todmorden. Mytholmroyd, together with Hebden Bridge, forms Hebden Royd.

Halifax is the commercial, cultural and administrative centre of the borough. Calderdale is served by Calderdale Council, which is headquartered in Halifax, with some functions based in Todmorden.

History
The Roman settlement of Cambodunum was probably located within Calderdale. A Roman fort has been excavated in Slack, which is in the neighbouring borough of Kirklees, but its identity is not yet certain.

The borough was formed on 1 April 1974, under the Local Government Act 1972, by the merger of the then county borough of Halifax, the boroughs of Brighouse, Todmorden and the urban districts of Elland, Hebden Royd, Ripponden, Sowerby Bridge, part of Queensbury and Shelf urban district and Hepton Rural District.

In 2022, Yorkshire Water built an emergency water pipeline from Calderdale to Ponden Reservoir in Haworth as Yorkshire experienced its driest period on record.

Coat of arms

The Coat of arms of Calderdale Metropolitan Borough Council was granted to the new council just a few months after the borough was formed in 1974. The Paschal lamb is the emblem of John the Baptist, the patron saint of wool workers. It was shown on the former arms of Halifax. The green and blue wavy line of the shield symbolises the River Calder and Calder Valley. The white rose is for Yorkshire. The crest shows a rose bush with nine white flowers representing the nine former authorities that now comprise the Calderdale district. The bush is shown growing out of a mural crown, a common feature in municipal arms. The lion supporters are taken from the arms of Halifax and also for England. A lion also featured on the shield of the arms of Brighouse. The black crescents, also from the arms of Brighouse, are featured on the arms of the Brighouse family. The blue wave around each lion's collar is from the arms of Todmorden and represents the Calder again. The motto, is Latin for 'Industry, skill, and foresight'. The formal description, or blazon, of the arms is: 
For the arms: Vert a Paschal Lamb proper supporting over the shoulder a Cross Staff Or flying therefrom a forked Pennon of St. George between in chief a Bar wavy Argent charged with a Barruret wavy Azure and in base a Rose Argent barbed and seeded proper; and for the crest: On a Wreath Argent and Vert out of a Mural Crown a Rose Tree of nine branches proper each terminating in a Rose Argent barbed and seeded proper; and for the supporters: On either side a Lion Or gorged with a collar wavy Azure and holding aloft in the interior forepaw a Crescent Sable; Motto: .

Settlements
As well as the six towns, there are numerous settlements including:
 Bailiff Bridge, Bank Top, Barkisland, Blackley, Blackshaw Head, Boothtown, Boulderclough, Bradshaw
 Chiserley, Clifton, Colden, Copley, Cornholme, Cottonstones, Cragg Vale
 Eastwood
 Fountain Head, Friendly
 Gauxholme, Greetland
 Heptonstall, Highroadwell, Hipperholme, Holmfield, Holywell Green, Hove Edge, Hubberton
 Illingworth
 Jagger Green
 Kebroyd, King Cross, Krumlin
 Lee Mount, Lightcliffe, Luddenden, Luddendenfoot, Lumbutts, Lydgate
 Mankinholes, Midgley, Mill Bank, Mixenden, Mount Tabor, Mytholm, Mytholmroyd 
 Norland Town, Northowram, Norton Tower, Norwood Green
 Ogden, Old Town, Ovenden
 Peckett Well, Pellon, Portsmouth, Pye Nest
 Rastrick, Ripponden, Rishworth
 Salterhebble, Savile Park, Shelf, Skircoat Green, Siddal, Slack, Sowerby, Soyland, Southowram, Sowood, Soyland, Stainland, Stone Chair, Stump Cross
 Triangle
 Upper Edge
 Wainstalls, Walsden, Warland, Warley Town, West Vale, Wholestone Hill, Wheatley

Education

Two selective schools in Calderdale jointly administer an 11+ admissions exam: The Crossley Heath School, in Savile Park and North Halifax Grammar School in Illingworth.

Both schools achieve excellent GCSE and A-level results, achieving a large proportion of A* to C grades at GCSE level. In 2005 the Crossley Heath School was the highest ranking co-educational school in the north of England.

Calderdale College is a local further education college on Francis Street, in Halifax. In December 2006 it was announced that Calderdale College, in partnership with Leeds Metropolitan University, would open a new higher education institution in January 2007 called University Centre Calderdale.

Local government

The borough is divided into 17 wards and each is represented on Calderdale Metropolitan Borough Council by three councillors. Each councillor is normally elected on a first past the post basis for a four-year period which is staggered with the other councillors of that ward so that only one councillor per ward is up for election at any one time. Exceptions to this include by-elections and ward boundary changes.

The wards are: Brighouse; Calder; Elland; Greetland and Stainland; Hipperholme and Lightcliffe; Illingworth and Mixenden; Luddendenfoot; Northowram and Shelf; Ovenden; Park; Rastrick; Ryburn; Skircoat; Sowerby Bridge; Todmorden; Town; and Warley.

Mayors of Calderdale

 1974–75: Joseph Tolan
 1975–76: Mrs Kathleen M. Cawdry
 1976–77: Mrs Mona Ross Mitchell
 1977–78: Eric Dennett
 1978–79: Richard Deadman
 1979–80: Mrs Betty Wildsmith
 1980–81: Harry Wilson
 1981–82: Eric Whitehead
 1982–83: David Trevor Shutt
 1983–84: Kevin Gordon Lord
 1984–85: John Bradley
 1985–86: Thomas Lawler
 1986–87: David J. Fox
 1987–88: Wilfred Sharp
 1988–89: Albert Berry
 1989–90: Joseph Kneafsey
 1990–91: Joseph Tolan
 1991–92: Thomas J. McElroy
 1992–93: William C. A. Carpenter
 1993–94: Anthony D. J. Mazey
 1994–95: Stephen J. Pearson
 1995–96: Graham E. A. Reason
 1996–97: Dawn Neal
 1997: Susan Tucker
 1997–98: Alan Worth
 1998–99: Alan Worth
 1999–2000: Graham Hall
 2000–01: Peter Sephton Coles
 2001–02: Chris O'Connor
 2002–03: Patrick Phillips
 2003–04: Mrs Geraldine Carter
 2004–05: Olwen Jean Arlette Jennings
 2005–06: John Williamson
 2006–07: Colin Stout
 2007–08: Martin Peel
 2008–09: Conrad Winterburn
 2009–10: Arshad Mahmood
 2010: Ann McAllister
 2010–11: Keith Watson
 2011–12: Nader Fekri JP
 2012–13: John Hardy
 2013–14: Ann Martin
 2014–15: Pat Allen
 2015–16: Lisa Lambert
 2016–17: Howard Blagbrough
 2017–18: Ferman Ali
 2018–19: Marcus Thompson
 2019–21: Dot Foster
 2021–22: Chris Pillai
 2022–23: Angie Gallagher

Demographics
The largest ethnic group within Calderdale at the 2011 census was White British at 86.7%, down from 90.8% in 2001. The next largest ethnic group are Pakistanis, comprising 6.8% of the population (4.9% in 2001).

In 2011, Christians comprised 60.6% of the borough's population. This was followed by those of no religion (30.2%) and Muslims (7.8%).

In 2019, those who were not born in the UK formed 8% of Calderdale's population.

Public services, transport and facilities

Health
Calderdale is part of the Calderdale Primary Care Trust, South West Yorkshire NHS Foundation Trust and Calderdale & Huddersfield NHS Foundation Trust. The borough has two hospitals and one hospice. The main hospital (part of Calderdale & Huddersfield NHS Foundation Trust) is the Calderdale Royal Hospital, located on the main route to Huddersfield in Salterhebble. It has specialist departments: Calderdale's A&E department and the Calderdale Birth Centre. The hospital was built and opened in 2001 on the site of the original Halifax General Hospital. After the new hospital opened, the Royal Halifax Infirmary closed and all services were transferred, as were services from Northowram Hospital. NHS Ambulance services are provided by the Yorkshire Ambulance Service from stations in Halifax, Brighouse and Todmorden. Overgate Hospice provides specialist palliative care for adults in Calderdale. Elland Hospital, Calderdale's only private hospital, is located by the Calderdale Way. Formerly BUPA Elland Independent Hospital, it is now owned and operated by Classic Hospitals.

Police
Calderdale is served by West Yorkshire Police; whose Calderdale Division headquarters is at Halifax police station. Other police stations are located in Todmorden and at Brighouse, which reopened in 2009.

Fire and rescue
West Yorkshire Fire & Rescue covers Calderdale and it has five fire stations in the borough. These are located at Rastrick (Since 2015), King Cross (Halifax Fire Station), Mytholmroyd, Illingworth, and Todmorden.

Libraries
Calderdale Libraries provides services through 22 local library branches, including a central library in Halifax, and also offer a home library service and digital library service. In 2014, construction began on a new central library and archive building in Halifax, adjacent to the Piece Hall and the Square Chapel. The new Central Library and Archive officially opened in September 2017.

Sports in Calderdale 
Pools,

There are three current swimming pools in Calderdale. These are located in Todmorden, Brighouse and Sowerby Bridge. Halifax is currently in the phase of getting a new swimming pool after the old pool shut in 2021.

Sports Facilities, 

Sports Facilities include North Bridge Leisure Centre (Halifax, Currently Closed), Sowerby Bridge Swimming Pool, Brighouse Leisure Centre and Pool, Todmorden Swimming Pool, The Shay Stadium (Halifax Towns Football Pitch) and Spring Hall (Halifax, Track and field).

Transport

Railway stations,

Brighouse, Halifax, Hebden Bridge, Mythomroyd, Sowerby Bridge, Todmorden, Walsden and the currently funded Elland station in planning.

Freedom of the Borough
The following people and military units have received the Freedom of the Borough of Calderdale.

Individuals
 Hannah Cockroft: 13 September 2012.
 Sally Wainwright: 12 March 2020.

Military units
 The Duke of Wellington's Regiment: 27 July 2002.

References

External links

 Calderdale Council website
 Calderdale College website
 From Weaver to Web, online visual archive of Calderdale history
 Listed buildings in Calderdale
 Malcolm Bull's Calderdale Companion
 (Twinned with Calderdale) County Mayo,Ireland

 
Metropolitan boroughs
Leeds City Region
Local government districts in West Yorkshire
Calderdale
Calderdale
Calderdale
Calderdale
Calderdale
Calderdale